The 1912 Richmond Rebels season was the first and only season for the Rebels and the United States Baseball League, which collapsed after just over a month of play.

Regular season
Few individual game results are known from that year. However, the Rebels defeated the Washington Senators on May 1, opening day, by a score of 2-0 before 9,000 fans. They also defeated New York (4-0) and Cincinnati (5-2) several days later.

Standings

Roster

References 

Richmond Rebels seasons